Timothy Lionel DeFoor (born November 18, 1961) is an American politician who currently serves as the Pennsylvania Auditor General. He previously served as the Controller of Dauphin County, Pennsylvania. He is a member of the Republican Party.

DeFoor's victory in the 2020 Pennsylvania Auditor General election made him the first African American and person of color to win election to statewide executive office in Pennsylvania, and the second to hold statewide office following Tim Reese. Upon taking office as Auditor General, DeFoor also became the first Republican to hold that office since Barbara Hafer, who left office in 1997.

Education
Prior to attending college, DeFoor graduated from Susquehanna Township High School. DeFoor holds an associate degree in paralegal studies from Harrisburg Area Community College. He also graduated from Pennsylvania State University with a bachelor's degree in psychology, and earned a second bachelor's degree from the University of Pittsburgh in sociology and history. DeFoor earned a master's degree in project management from Harrisburg University of Science and Technology.

Career

Early career
DeFoor began his career in 1986 as an investigator for the Dauphin County public defender's office. He subsequently worked as an investigator for Pennsylvania's Office of the Inspector General and the Pennsylvania Attorney General. He has also worked as an internal auditor and fraud investigator for UPMC Health Plan, and as a consultant for Booz Allen Hamilton.

County controller
DeFoor won election to the office of Dauphin County controller in 2015, defeating Democratic nominee Eric Gutshall. He was the first African American to win election to a county row office in Dauphin County. During his first term as controller, DeFoor's work won recognition from the Government Finance Officers Association. DeFoor then won re-election in 2019, running unopposed. After being elected Auditor General, DeFoor submitted his resignation as county controller on December 21, 2020, to take effect on the morning of January 19, 2021. Mary Bateman was elected on November 2, 2021, to succeed him as controller.

Auditor General
DeFoor announced his intent to run in the 2020 Pennsylvania Auditor General election on December 19, 2019. DeFoor was endorsed by the Republican State Committee of Pennsylvania in January 2020, leading one of his Republican primary opponents, Dennis Stuckey, to withdraw from the race. The other remaining Republican in the field, Cris Dush, later withdrew to seek a seat in the Pennsylvania State Senate, leaving DeFoor as the sole candidate in the Republican primary. In the general election, DeFoor was pitted against Dr. Nina Ahmad, a progressive activist and former deputy mayor of Philadelphia. On November 6, 2020, the Associated Press called the race for DeFoor.

DeFoor took office as Auditor General on January 19, 2021, succeeding Democrat Eugene DePasquale. In his inaugural address, DeFoor paid tribute to figures such as John Lewis, who he credited with paving the way for himself to enter politics, and pledged to "look at every issue through a non-partisan lens." He further pledged to maintain members of DePasquale's staff who he felt were capable, and stated that one of his first priorities as Auditor General would be to complete an audit of Governor Tom Wolf's COVID-19 business waiver program.

Electoral history

References

External links
Pennsylvania Auditor General government website
Timothy DeFoor for Auditor General campaign website
Timothy DeFoor at Ballotpedia
Profile at Vote Smart

|-

21st-century American politicians
African-American people in Pennsylvania politics
Black conservatism in the United States
Living people
Pennsylvania Auditors General
Pennsylvania Republicans
Pennsylvania State University alumni
People from Dauphin County, Pennsylvania
University of Pittsburgh alumni
21st-century African-American politicians
1961 births